Joti Jot (Punjabi: ਜੋਤੀ ਜੋਤ; meaning: immersed in the Eternal Light), alternatively transliterated as Jyoti Jot, is a phrase used in Sikhism to describe the physical passing (death) of the Sikh gurus and other spiritually liberated (mukti) individuals. The Sikh gurus and the Sikh scriptures teach that if someone is immortal (or attained immortality during the course of their life, known as jeevan mukt), when they leave this existence they have not died but rather they have rejoined with God, as someone who is an immortal cannot die. This special condition is given the word Joti Jot.

See also 

 Gurpurab
 Guru Gaddi
 Martyrdom in Sikhism

References 

Sikh terminology